Camborne is a town in Cornwall, England. The population at the 2011 Census was 20,845. The northern edge of the parish includes a section  of the South West Coast Path, Hell's Mouth and Deadman's Cove.

Camborne was formerly one of the richest tin mining areas in the world and home to the Camborne School of Mines.

Toponymy
Craig Weatherhill explains Camborne thus: "Cambron c. 1100 - 1816) Cambron, ?'crook-hill')"

Kammbronn is Cornish for 'crooked hill'. The word 'kamm', crooked, is the same in the Breton language, and the Welsh, Gaelic and Irish Gaelic word is 'cam'. 'Hill' in Welsh is 'bryn'.

Geography 
It is the ecclesiastical centre of a large civil parish and has a town council. Camborne-Redruth is on the northern side of the Carn Brea/Carnmenellis granite upland which slopes northwards to the sea. The two towns are linked by the A3047 road which was turnpiked in 1839 and the villages along the road (from the west) were Roskear, Tuckingmill, Pool and Illogan. Running north-south are a number of small streams with narrow river valleys which have been deeply-cut following centuries of tin streaming and other industrial processes. An example is the Red River valley which crosses the A3047 at Tuckingmill. To the north, the A30 (road) forms a boundary between the urban area and the agricultural land on the other side.

Climate

The UK Met Office operate an Upper Air Station in Camborne.

History
The first mention of the medieval Camborne churchtown is in 1181 although in 1931 the ruins of a probable Romano-British villa were found at Magor Farm, Illogan, near Camborne, and excavated that year under the guidance of the Royal Institution of Cornwall. It is the only Roman villa to be found in the whole of Cornwall. 

There are also early Christian sites such as an inscribed altar stone, (now in the Church of St Martin and St Meriadoc), and dated to the 10th or 11th centuries, which attests to the existence of a settlement then. 

Langdon (1896) records seven stone crosses in the parish of which two are at Pendarves. By the late Middle Ages manorial holdings developed in the surrounding area, and church-paths linked the churchtown to the outlying hamlets. Cornish medieval mystery plays were held in a playing place and the churchyard is said to have had a pilgrimage chapel and holy well. John Norden visited in 1584 and described Camborne as "". At this time there would have been moors and rough grazing as well as small fields in the surrounding countryside.

By 1708 Camborne had rights to hold markets and three fairs a year which may be an indication of tin mining in the area; Camborne's was inland and in an unfavourable location for trading. Mining is first recorded locally in the 1400s with early exploitation of the small streams cutting through the mineralised area and from shallow mines following lodes. Adit mining was first recorded in the 16th century. A sign of increasing industrial activity and increasing industrial population is the first chapel built in 1806 and the development of a local Methodist community. In 1823 the population was around 2,000 and in 1841 it was 4,377, with 75 smiths recorded and over two-thirds of the working population employed in the mining industry. In the expanding town gasworks were opened in 1834, the Hayle Railway was built (1834–37) and Holmans opened a small foundry in 1839.

Mining

Camborne is best known as a centre for the former Cornish tin and copper mining industry, having its working heyday during the later 18th and early 19th centuries. Camborne was just a village until transformed by the mining boom which began in the late 18th century and saw the Camborne and Redruth district become the richest mining area in the world. Although a considerable number of ruinous stacks and engine houses remain, they cannot begin to convey the scenes of 150 years ago when scores of mines transfigured the landscape.

As the economic recession of the 1870s led to the first years of mining decline in Camborne, social tensions mounted. In October 1873 thousands of miners, aided and abetted by the townspeople, rioted against a hated, authoritarian police force. One of the greatest shows of mining defiance in Cornish history left the Town Hall vandalised, the Police Station ransacked, and the estimated fifty constables present in the town beaten and scattered. The militia were called in from Plymouth to quell the insurrection, and the Home Secretary, Robert Lowe, asked to be kept informed of events. The Camborne riots were reported in the national newspapers and Sir Colman Rashleigh, JP for Cornwall, had to address the Grand Jury regarding the tumult. The entire Camborne police force was found to be at fault and either removed from duty or transferred as a result. No rioter was ever convicted.

Dolcoath Mine, (English: Old Ground Mine), the 'Queen of Cornish Mines' was, at a depth of 3,500 feet (1,067 m), for many years the deepest mine in the world, not to mention one of the oldest before its closure in 1921. The last working tin mine in Europe, South Crofty, which closed in 1998, is also to be found in Camborne.

Mining related 

Apart from the mines themselves, Camborne was also home to many important related industries, including the once world-renowned foundry of Holman Bros Ltd (CompAir). Holmans, a family business founded in 1801, was for generations, Camborne's, and indeed Cornwall's largest manufacturer of industrial equipment, even making the famous Sten submachine gun for a stint during the Second World War. The Holman Projector was used by the Royal Navy. At its height Holmans was spread over three sites within Camborne, employing some three and half thousand men. Despite Britain's industrial decline, Compair Holmans Camborne factory finally closed in 2001. On the afternoon of Tuesday 5 December 2006, a wall of the Holmans factory was leaning towards the railway line, as a result the line west of Truro was closed for the afternoon and night and disrupting railway services, as it was feared the wall could collapse onto the mainline, part of the derelict factory was later demolished that night.

A modest quantity of South Crofty tin was purchased by a local enterprise and this gradually dwindling stock is used to make specialist tin jewellery, branded as the South Crofty Collection. Tin originally mined at South Crofty was used to form the bronze medals awarded in the 2012 London Olympics

Camborne School of Mines 
Because of the prior importance of metal mining to the Cornish economy, the Camborne School of Mines (CSM) developed as the only specialist hard rock education establishment in the United Kingdom, until the Royal School of Mines was established in 1851. Plans for the school were laid out in 1829, leading to the current school in 1888. It now forms part of the University of Exeter; it moved to the University's Tremough campus (now known as Penryn Campus) in 2004. CSM graduates work in the mining industry all over the world. It has a fine collection of minerals in its museum of geology.

Steam locomotion 

On Christmas Eve 1801, the Puffing Devil – a steam-powered road locomotive built by Camborne engineer Richard Trevithick – made its way up Camborne Hill in Cornwall. It was the world's first self-propelled passenger carrying vehicle. The events have been turned into a local song:

Going up Camborne Hill, coming down,
Going up Camborne Hill, coming down,
The horses stood still,
The wheels turn around,
Going up Camborne Hill, coming down.

Trevithick was born in Penponds, in 1771, a miner's son, and was educated at Camborne School. His achievements (not to mention steam power, mining and Cornish culture as a whole) are celebrated every last Saturday of April as the town's 'Trevithick Day', and by his statue standing outside Camborne Public Library.

Cornish language 
The Cornish language was the language of the area around Camborne until the beginning of the 18th century and it is recorded that everyone living west of Truro spoke Cornish in 1644. Nicholas Boson wrote that Cornish was spoken as far east as Redruth and Falmouth circa 1700. In 1700 the pioneering Celtic linguist Edward Lhuyd came to Cornwall to study the language and visited Camborne, detailing many aspects of the parish.

One of the most important surviving works of medieval Cornish literature is Beunans Meriasek, the Life of St Meriadoc the patron saint of Camborne. In the 19th century the nickname for Camborne people was Mera-jacks, or Merry-geeks, and those who washed in St Meriasek's well were called Merrasicks, Merrasickers, Moragicks or Mearagaks.

In the 20th century several Cornish words and phrases were noted as still in use amongst the inhabitants of Camborne. These include taw tavas (silent tongue) and allycumpoester (all in order).

Although a limited amount of Cornish was taught in some schools in west Cornwall during the 19th and early 20th centuries the first school to properly dedicate itself to teaching revived Cornish was the Mount Pleasant House school run by E. G. Retallack Hooper in the post-Second World War period. By 1984 Cornish was being taught in Troon and Camborne primary schools as well as Camborne secondary school and there was a Cornish language playgroup. In 2000 Roskear and Weeth schools were teaching Cornish.

In the 2011 UK census, although there was no specific Cornish language question, thirty people living in the parish of Camborne declared that Cornish was their main language at home, thirteen in Troon and Beacon.

Governance

Parliamentary representation
The Camborne and Redruth constituency was created for the 2010 general election, following a review of parliamentary representation in Cornwall by the Boundary Commission for England, which increased the number of seats in the county from five to six.
It is primarily a successor to the former Falmouth and Camborne seat.

In the 2019 United Kingdom general election the results were:

Local government
The Camborne Local Board was established in 1873; the seal was a mine shaft and engine house depicted with the date 1873 and the legend "The Local Board for the District of Camborne". This was replaced by the Camborne Urban District in 1895 which built the municipal buildings and fire station in 1903. The urban district was merged with that of Redruth and parts of Redruth Rural District and Helston Rural District (both of which were being abolished) in 1934 to form the Camborne-Redruth Urban District. The urban district persisted until it was merged into the Kerrier district of Cornwall under the Local Government Act 1972.

Cornwall Council
Until May 2021, Camborne was represented by five electoral divisions: Camborne Pendarves, Camborne Roskear, Camborne Trelowarren, Camborne Treslothan, and Camborne Treswithian. From the 2021 Cornwall Council election, Camborne will be covered by four divisions: Four Lanes, Beacon and Troon; Camborne Roskear and Tuckingmill; Camborne Trelowarren; and Camborne West and Treswithian.

List of mayors

List of Town Criers
Henry Eva Hocking, circa 1850-1873
Joseph Treloar, 1873-1886
Charles Rosevear, 1886-1901
George Rosevear, 1901-1934

Church history 

Camborne's parish church is dedicated to St Martin and St Meriadoc: it is entirely of granite, of 15th century date, but incorporating earlier structural features, including a Norman chevron stone in the west wall of the north aisle found in 2009 and is listed Grade I. St Martin was added to the original dedication to St Meriadoc in the 15th century. There is a western tower about 60 feet high containing eight bells (with a clock before 1882) and the aisles are identical in design: the building was gutted and restored in 1861-62 and an outer south aisle was added in 1878–79 to a design by James Piers St Aubyn. The church was re-opened on 7 August 1879 by Edward Benson, the Bishop of Truro.

An inscribed altar stone found at Chapel Ia, Troon (now set up as the Lady Chapel altar in the parish church), and dated to the 10th or 11th centuries, attests to the existence of a settlement then. It is inscribed ''. The chapel of St Ia was recorded in 1429 and a holy well was nearby. The site was called Fenton-ear (i.e. the well of Ia). The stone is very similar to one now used as the mensa of the Lady Chapel altar at Treslothan Parish Church, formerly used from c.1841 to 1955 as the base for a sundial in the grounds of Pendarves House.

Camborne churchyard contains a number of crosses collected from nearby sites: the finest is one found in a well at Crane in 1896 but already known from William Borlase's account of it when it was at Fenton-ear. Arthur Langdon (1896) records six crosses in the parish, including two at Pendarves, two at Trevu and one outside the Institute. There is a cross at Camborne Park Recreation Ground (NHLE ref. no. 1003049).

Two other chapels are known to have existed in the medieval period: one not far from the parish church was dedicated to Our Lady and St Anne and one at Menadarva (derived from Merther-Derwa) was one of Celtic origin dedicated to St Derwa, Virgin, but mentioned in 1429.

Transport 
The A30 trunk road now by-passes the town around its northern edge. The old A30 through the town has become the A3047. There is a small bus station on Union Street, which has featured in tales by Cornish comedian Jethro.

The railway station is a half-mile south from the town centre, with a level crossing and footbridge at its eastern end. Camborne railway station used to be famous for its short platforms, which meant that passengers on main line services between London Paddington and Penzance could only board and alight from certain carriages. Partly because of this not all services stopped at Camborne, preferring nearby Redruth (which is also classed by Great Western Railway (GWR) as a short station stop). The platforms have been upgraded but the memory lives on, again partly in stories by the comedian Jethro. Camborne railway station is served by CrossCountry and GWR trains.

Camborne was, for a quarter of a century, one of the termini of Cornwall's only tram service. This system was opened in November 1902 and ran a regular service to Redruth until it closed in September 1927.

Sport 
Camborne RFC were established in 1878 and are one of the most famous clubs in Cornwall, having produced numerous Cornwall players over the years. In 1987 Camborne were the highest placed Cornish club in the newly formed National leagues when they entered at 1987–88 Courage Area League South (equivalent to National League 2 South today). Camborne is one of the grounds used by the Cornish rugby team and has hosted many notable international sides including the New Zealand 'All Blacks' in 1905, 1924 and 1953, Australia in 1908, 1947 and 1967, South Africa 1960, United States 1977 and numerous other touring sides such as the South African Barbarians and Canterbury (NZ). Since 2006 it was agreed to ground share the Recreation Ground with local Division One team the Cornish Pirates and the ground has undergone major refurbishment including a new stand for the 2007–08 and 2008–09 seasons. This arrangement ceased as of 2012 season and the Pirates now play at the Mennaye Field in Penzance.

Notable local rugby players include Josh Matavesi 18-year-old debut for Fiji against Scotland in 2010, his younger brother Sam, debut against Canada in 2013, Roger Arthur, Llanelli and Wales and Andy Reed, Camborne, Bath, and Scotland British Lions Luke Charteris, Wales.

Economy 

The region of Camborne, Pool and Redruth district is currently at the centre of a £150 million redevelopment, which hopes to reverse social and economic decline in this former industrial heartland.

CPR Regeneration 
CPR Regeneration (CPRR), one of the government's 19 Urban Regeneration Companies (URCs) is overseeing a large urban renewal programme in the country on behalf of a range of partners including Cornwall Council, the South West of England Regional Development Agency (SWERDA) and the Homes and Communities Agency. CPRR is tasked with driving the regeneration of former industrial land, attracting businesses and helping them create sustainable jobs; supporting local business growth ambitions and fostering employment growth through increasing the skills of those in and out of work. To date, as well as working on supporting businesses in the area—especially those in the town centres, CPRR has been engaged in the process of assembling sites, securing agreements with developers and doing enabling works for major projects such as the east–west link road between Redruth and Camborne.

A challenge faced by CPRR has been to work collaboratively with the owners of the South Crofty mine (which occupies a central position in the Pool regeneration area) to both allow mine development operations to continue and secure the re-development of the wider area around the mine. Stories did appear in the press  regarding alleged illegal in-fill of ventilation shafts by CPRR. The truth—that English Partnerships had found old unmarked shafts on development sites which were in danger of collapse and made them good with concrete caps (removable if needed later by the mine company)--was lost. CPRR has continued to advance major projects in the area, such as a range of housing and infrastructure schemes, and will help SWERDA and the Homes and Communities Agency bring these forward shortly. Some of the work of the URC is becoming apparent, with works on the Pool Innovation Centre and the Trevenson Road area both advancing well.

Criticism of the Regional Development Agency 
Local MPs have criticised SWERDA for interfering in the private sector, and said there may be ulterior motives. Andrew George, MP for St Ives, said, "The RDA’s antics are at odds with the claims made to me by the Minister in Parliament and in a letter that the RDA 'will be informed by the outcome of public consultation. I am astounded that a public body can be acting in such a predatory manner. The RDA seems to want to jump in where it is not wanted and yet it doesn’t intervene where it is. There are places like the Union Hotel in Penzance where the owner and local applicants would be grateful if the RDA were able to step in and purchase but the RDA says that it must be market tested first. Yet when they are faced with a Mine where the owners want to do something constructive, the RDA seem keen to intervene. The public sector has a role in supporting the private sector when projects are not able to be self sustaining. Public money and resources should not be used to undermine the efforts of the private sector".

Education 
A Church of England National School was built in College Street in 1844 (replaced by a newer building further up the street towards the parish church in 1896-now demolished); in the following year a school for four hundred boys was opened in the Centenary Methodist Chapel and in 1847 the Basset Road British (Methodist) School was opened. A School of Mines started in 1872 with the Basset family paying for chemistry laboratories. The town now has a number of schools covering all age ranges, notably the main secondary school, Camborne Science and International Academy, and a campus of Cornwall College.

Twinning 
Camborne is twinned with two places: Santez-Anna-Wened in Brittany, France, and Pachuca, Hidalgo in Mexico. Camborne was twinned with Pachuca at a ceremony in Mexico on 3 July 2008.

The town name inspired the name of Camborne, New Zealand, a seaside suburb of Porirua City developed by an investment company headed by an Arthur Cornish. Most of its street names are of Cornish origin.

Culture

Music 
Camborne Town Band has been contesting music records from the late 19th century until the present day. It has performed on BBC Radio and BBC Television.
Holman Climax Male Voice Choir, based in Camborne, was formed in 1940 by Edgar S. Kessell MBE (1910–1981).
Ben Salfield the lutenist lives just outside of the town.

Literature and film 
Alan M. Kent's 2005 novel Proper job, Charlie Curnow ! is set in and around the Trelawney Estate, a fictional housing estate based on the Grenville Estate, Troon.
 Zoie Palmer is an actress who was born in Camborne.

Notable people
 Annie Carvosso (1861-1932), activist and social reformer

References

External links 

Camborne Town Council – Information on the town
Cornwall Record Office Online Catalogue for Camborne
Camborne Town Website

 
Civil parishes in Cornwall
Towns in Cornwall
Mining in Cornwall
Cornish Killas